Martin Damm and David Prinosil were the defending champions but did not compete that year.

Wayne Black and Kevin Ullyett won in the final 6–3, 6–3 against Jiří Novák and David Rikl.

Seeds

  Jiří Novák /  David Rikl (final)
  Joshua Eagle /  Sandon Stolle (semifinals)
  Wayne Black /  Kevin Ullyett (champions)
  Petr Pála /  Pavel Vízner (first round)

Draw

External links
 2001 Copenhagen Open Doubles draw

2001 Copenhagen Open - 2
2001 ATP Tour